Brother Love can refer to:

 Angus McDonough, a fictional character from the television series iZombie, also known as "Brother Love"
 Bruce Prichard, professional wrestling personality best known for his "Brother Love" character
 Brother Love (rock musician), aka Larry Florman, a musician popular in the realm of podcasting
Sean Combs, American rapper and producer

See also
 Brotherly love (disambiguation)